In enzymology, a glucuronate-1-phosphate uridylyltransferase is an enzyme that catalyzes the chemical reaction

UTP + 1-phospho-alpha-D-glucuronate  diphosphate + UDP-glucuronate

Thus, the two substrates of this enzyme are UTP and 1-phospho-alpha-D-glucuronate, whereas its two products are diphosphate and UDP-glucuronate.

This enzyme belongs to the family of transferases, specifically those transferring phosphorus-containing nucleotide groups (nucleotidyltransferases).  The systematic name of this enzyme class is UTP:1-phospho-alpha-D-glucuronate uridylyltransferase. Other names in common use include UDP-glucuronate pyrophosphorylase, UDP-D-glucuronic acid pyrophosphorylase, UDP-glucuronic acid pyrophosphorylase, and uridine diphosphoglucuronic pyrophosphorylase.  This enzyme participates in pentose and glucuronate interconversions and ascorbate and aldarate metabolism.

References 

 

EC 2.7.7
Enzymes of unknown structure